The Autovía A-12 is a highway in Spain known as the Autovía del Camino de Santiago between Pamplona and Burgos.

It follows the route of the N-111 passing via Logroño and Burgos where it becomes the Autovía A-231.

References

A-12
A-12
A-12
A-12